Klin nad Bodrogom is a village and municipality in the Trebišov District in the Košice Region of south-eastern Slovakia.

History

In historical records the village was first mentioned in 1378.

Geography
The village lies at an altitude of 94 metres and covers an area of 3.662 km². In catastral area of the village is lowest point of Slovakia at 94,3 metres.
It has a population of about 195 people.

Ethnicity
The village is about 60% Hungarian and 40% Slovak.

Facilities
The village has a soccer pitch.

Genealogical resources

The records for genealogical research are available at the state archive "Statny Archiv in Kosice, Slovakia"

 Roman Catholic church records (births/marriages/deaths): 1743-1909 (parish B)
 Greek Catholic church records (births/marriages/deaths): 1787-1878 (parish B)
 Reformated church records (births/marriages/deaths): 1758-1924 (parish B)

See also
 List of municipalities and towns in Slovakia

External links
https://web.archive.org/web/20071006173841/http://www.statistics.sk/mosmis/eng/run.html
Surnames of living people in Klin nad Bodrogom

Historical monuments
Interesting ruins of a small Gothic church from the 13th century lie at the end of the village (by the old parsonage and the municipal authority office), near the banks of the Bodrog River. It probably became abandoned and perished in the 17th century. There were some attempts to rebuild the church in the second half of the 19th century, but these weren't successful and didn't alter the original appearance of the structure too much.

Villages and municipalities in Trebišov District
Zemplín (region)